The Shareholder Rights Directive 2007/36/EC, amended by the Directive 2017/828/EU, establishes requirements in relation to the exercise of certain shareholder rights attached to EU-listed companies. It also establishes specific requirements in order to encourage shareholder engagement, in particular in the long term.

The Shareholder Rights Directive 2007 replaced the First Company Law Directive 68/151/EEC. It set out minimum requirements relating to the holding of meetings in the EU. The directive was amended and largely extended by Directive 2017/828/EU of 17 May 2017, also known as SRD II, as regards the encouragement of long-term shareholder engagement.

Contents
The directive's structure is as follows:
Chapter Ia. Identification of shareholders, transmission of information, facilitation of exercise of shareholders' rights
Chapter Ib. Transparency of institutional investors, asset managers and proxy advisors
Chapter II on General meetings of shareholders including the remuneration of directors and related party transactions:
art 5, shareholders should be given 21 days' notice of meetings, votes by electronic means should be facilitated
art 6, that a threshold no higher than 5% of shareholders must be able to table resolutions at meetings
art 9, to ask questions
art 10, to vote by proxy
art 14, voting results publishable on website

Under SRD II, companies must develop and publish a policy stating how voting rights operate and how shareholders are engaged in the running of the company. The principle known as "comply or explain" operates, i.e. companies are not obliged to adhere to this requirement but if they choose not to do so they must explain why.

See also
UK company law
European company law

References

Further reading
S Grundmann, European Company Law (Intersentia 2006)

External links
Directive 2007/36/EC as to the exercise of certain rights of shareholder in listed companies (the original directive)
Directive 2017/828/EU amending directive 2007/36/EC as regards the encouragement of long-term shareholder engagement
EU internal market page on company law
EU list of company law directives in force

United Kingdom company law
European Union directives
2007 in law
2007 in the European Union
Shareholders